Elizabeth Cullingford is an American scholar of literature and Irish literature and the Jane Weinert Blumberg Chair and University Distinguished Teaching Professor at the University of Texas at Austin.

References

Year of birth missing (living people)
Living people
American literary historians
University of Texas at Austin faculty